Bhagwandas Patel (born 19 November 1943) is a Gujarati folklorist who pioneered research into Gujarat's tribal literature and brought the state's oral literature to the attention of the literary community.  In 1995, he compiled the first published tribal version of the Ramayana, Bhili Lokakhyan: Roam Sitma ni Varatathe, the Ramakatha of the Bhil people.

References

Living people
1943 births
Indian folklorists
Gujarati-language writers
Gujarati people